Timorichthys disjunctus is a species of viviparous brotula found in the Timor Sea where it occurs at depths of around .  This species grows to a length of  SL.

References

Bythitidae
Fish described in 2011